Qing Wang is a Chinese-born British academic, and Professor of Marketing and Innovation  at Warwick Business School.

Prior to joining Warwick Business School in 2000, she was a faculty member at SPRU, University of Sussex.

Wang has been a visiting professor at the Fuqua School of Business, Duke University (2004–05), Tsinghua School of Economics and Management, Tsinghua University (2002–03), and INSEAD, Singapore (2009).

References

Living people
Academics of the University of Warwick
Academics of the University of Sussex
Tianjin University alumni
Shanghai International Studies University alumni
Alumni of the University of Warwick
Year of birth missing (living people)